Wings of the Morning is a 1937 British drama film directed by Harold D. Schuster and starring Annabella, Henry Fonda, and Leslie Banks. Glenn Tryon was the original director but he was fired and replaced by Schuster. It was the first ever three-strip Technicolor movie shot in England or Europe. Jack Cardiff is credited as the camera operator.

Popular Irish tenor Count John McCormack appeared in the film singing "Believe Me, if All Those Endearing Young Charms" and "Killarney". The picture was French actress Annabella's first English language film. Henry Fonda met his second wife, Frances Ford Seymour, mother of Jane and Peter Fonda, on the set at Denham.

Premise
The story, begins in 1889 with the impetuous love of an Irish nobleman for the fiery Romany Gypsy princess Maria. The couple marry against social conventions in both communities but he dies shortly afterward in a riding accident. Maria leaves the estate and goes to Spain with the Gypsy caravan. The story continues 50 years later when Maria and her grand daughter return to Ireland.

Cast
 Annabella as Young Marie/Maria, Duchess of Leyva 
 Henry Fonda as Kerry Gilfallen 
 Leslie Banks as Lord Clontarf 
 Stewart Rome as Sir Valentine 
 Irene Vanbrugh as Old Marie 
 Harry Tate as Paddy 
 Helen Haye as Aunt Jenepher 
 Edward Underdown as Don Diego (as Teddy Underdown)
 Mark Daly as James Patrick Aloysius 'Jimmy' Brannigan
 Sam Livesey as Angelo
 E. V. H. Emmett as Racing Commentator
 R.C. Lyle as Racing Commentator (as Captain R.C. Lyle)
 John McCormack as himself - the Tenor
 Steve Donoghue as himself
 Evelyn Ankers as a party guest (uncredited)
 Hermione Darnborough as a gypsy dancer

References

External links
 
 
 
 

1937 films
1937 drama films
20th Century Fox films
British drama films
Films about Romani people
Films directed by Harold D. Schuster
Films shot in England
British horse racing films
1937 directorial debut films
1930s English-language films
1930s British films